South Giziga is an Afro-Asiatic language spoken in northern Cameroon. Dialects are Mi Mijivin, Muturami, and Rum.

South Giziga (60,000 speakers) is spoken south of Maroua in the Diamaré plain around the small massifs of Loutou, Moutourwa, Midjivin, etc. (in Diamaré department, Maroua commune and Mayo-Kani department, communes of Mindif, Kaélé, and Moutourwa).

Notes 

Biu-Mandara languages
Languages of Cameroon